Joseph William "Dad" Pender (October 15, 1875 – February 12, 1969) was an American football coach and university professor.  He served as the first ever head football coach at North Texas State Normal College, now the University of North Texas, from 1913 to 1914, compiling a 3–4 record. Pender joined the North Texas faculty in 1912, and served for many years in a wide range of posts such as athletics and government. He died in 1969 from a stroke.

Head coaching record

References

External links
 

1875 births
1969 deaths
North Texas Mean Green football coaches
University of North Texas faculty
Baylor University alumni